The Council for Religious and Life Stance Communities ( or STL) is an umbrella organization for religious organizations in Norway to foster interfaith dialogue. It was established on 30 May 1996 and has fourteen members from Baháʼí, Buddhism, Christianity, Hinduism, Holism, Humanism, Islam, Judaism and Sikhism. STL has eight local chapters, in Bergen, Drammen, Hamar, Kristiansand, Oslo, Stavanger, Trondheim and Tromsø.

Members

 Baháʼí Community of Norway
 Buddhist Federation of Norway
 Catholic Church in Norway
 Christian Community
 Christian Council of Norway
 The Church of Jesus Christ of Latter-day Saints (LDS Church)
 Church of Norway
 Gurdwara Sri Guru Nanak Dev Ji (Sikhism)
 Holistic Community
 Islamic Council Norway
 Jewish Communities in Norway
 Norwegian Humanist Association
 Norwegian Hindu Culture Centre
 Sanatan Madir Sabha (Hinduism)

References

External links
 Official website

Religion in Norway
1996 establishments in Norway
Organizations established in 1996
Organisations based in Oslo
Religious organisations based in Norway